Palang Sar (also Romanized as Palang Sār) is a village in Tamin Rural District, in the Central District of Mirjaveh County, Sistan and Baluchestan Province, Iran. At the 2006 census, its population was 54, in 8 families.

References 

Populated places in Mirjaveh County